Guillermo Daniel de los Santos Viana (born February 15, 1991) is a Uruguayan footballer who plays as a centre back.

Club career
De los Santos started his career playing with Cerro in 2011. He made his debut on 20 February 2011 against Defensor Sporting. On June 19, 2013 he signed for Club Nacional de Football.

International career

Under-20
During 2009, De los Santos played with the Uruguay national U20 football team at the 2011 FIFA U-20 World Cup in Colombia.

Under-22
In 2011, he was named to participate in the Uruguay national U23 team for the 2011 Pan American Games.

External links
 Profile at soccerway
 Profile at ESPN

1991 births
Living people
Footballers from Montevideo
Uruguayan footballers
Uruguay under-20 international footballers
Uruguayan expatriate footballers
Association football defenders
Uruguayan Primera División players
Ecuadorian Serie A players
C.A. Cerro players
Club Nacional de Football players
Defensor Sporting players
C.D. Universidad Católica del Ecuador footballers
Footballers at the 2011 Pan American Games
Pan American Games medalists in football
Pan American Games bronze medalists for Uruguay
Expatriate footballers in Ecuador
Medalists at the 2011 Pan American Games